The Texas State Bobcats men's basketball team is the basketball team that represents Texas State University. The school's team currently competes in the Sun Belt Conference. They are currently led by Terrence Johnson, who took over in September 2020 following the resignation of Danny Kaspar. The Bobcats last appeared in the NCAA tournament in 1997.

History
The Bobcats' first season of college basketball was in 1920. The Bobcats were one of the charter members of the Lone Star Conference, which started play in 1934. Starting in 1950, the team won nine conference titles, winning the 1960 NAIA title in the process along with playing in the NAIA Final Four four times before leaving in 1983 to join the Gulf Star Conference, playing from 1984 until 1987 until the conference disbanded. They soon joined the Southland Conference from 1987 until 2012, when they left for the Western Athletic Conference. A year later, they left the WAC and joined the Sun Belt Conference. Southwest Texas State became Texas State in 2003.

Head coaches
 Oscar W. Strahan (1920–1924, 1944–1946)
 Henry Shands (1924–1935)
 Joe Bailey Cheaney (1935–1939, 1942–1943)
 George Vest (1939–1942)
 Milton Jowers (1946–1961)
 Vernon McDonald (1961–1977)
 Dan Wall (1977–1981)
 Bob Derryberry (1981–1984)
 Celester Collier (1984–1986)
 Harry Larrabee (1986–1991)
 Jim Wooldridge (1991–1994)
 Mike Miller (1994–2000)
 Dennis Nutt (2000–2006)
 Doug Davalos (2006–2013)
 Danny Kaspar (2013–2020)
Terrence Johnson (2020–Present)

Postseason results

NCAA Division I Tournament results

^Minnesota win vacated for NCAA infractions

NIT results
The Bobcats have appeared in the National Invitation Tournament (NIT) one time. Their record is 0-1.

CIT results
The Bobcats have appeared in the CollegeInsider.com Postseason Tournament (CIT) two times. Their combined record is 2–2.

NAIA Division I Tournament results

Bobcats in the NBA

 Torgeir Bryn, 1989-1990, Los Angeles Clippers
 Jeff Foster, 1999-2012, Indiana Pacers

References

External links